Descendant(s) or descendent(s) may refer to:
 Lineal descendant, a consanguinous (i.e. biological) relative directly related to a person
 Collateral descendant, a relative descended from a brother or sister of an ancestor

Books
 "The Descendant" (short story), a short story by early 20th-century science-fiction writer H. P. Lovecraft
 The Descendants (novel), a 2007 novel by Kaui Hart Hemmings

Film and television
 Descendant (2003 film), a thriller film starring Katherine Heigl and Jeremy London
 Descendants (2008 film), an animated short film, Winner Tokyo Anime Award 2009
 Descendents (2008 film), a Chilean experimental horror film
 The Descendants, a 2011 American drama film directed by Alexander Payne with George Clooney
 The Descendants (2015 film), an Iranian film directed by Yaser Talebi
 Descendants (franchise), a Disney Channel television film franchise
Descendants (2015 film), the television film that started the above franchise
Descendants (soundtrack), the soundtrack for the television film
Descendant (2022 film), Netflix documentary

Music
 Descendents, a punk rock band from southern California

Other
 A type of node (element) in a tree structure
 A subordinate in a hierarchy
 Descendant (astrology), the western horizon-point directly opposite from the eastern horizon; also known as the ascendant (the rising sign); point at which the Sun sets in the west

See also 
 Descendance, an Australian Aboriginal dance company formed in 1999
 Antonyms:
 Ascendant
 Ancestor